Rhododendron sphaeroblastum (宽叶杜鹃) is a species of flowering plant in the family Ericaceae. The flowers are white, pink, red, or yellow.

References

Sources
"Rhododendron sphaeroblastum", I. B. Balfour & Forrest, Notes Roy. Bot. Gard. Edinburgh. 13: 60. 1920.

sphaeroblastum
Taxa named by Isaac Bayley Balfour
Taxa named by George Forrest (botanist)